Mariátegui is a surname of Basque origins. Notable people with the name include:

 Javier Mariátegui (1928–2008), Peruvian intellectual and psychiatrist
 José Carlos Mariátegui (1894–1930), Peruvian intellectual, journalist, political philosopher, and activist
 José-Carlos Mariátegui (born 1975), Peruvian scientist, writer, curator and scholar
 Manuel de Mariátegui, 1st Count of San Bernardo (1842–1905), Spanish noble and politician
 Sandro Mariátegui Chiappe (1921–2013), Peruvian politician who was the prime minister of Peru

See also
 BAP Mariátegui (FM-54), Peruvian Carvajal-class frigate
 Mariategui JLT, Peruvian insurance brokerage company

Basque-language surnames